BTX (for Balanced Technology eXtended) is a form factor for motherboards, originally intended to be the replacement for the aging ATX motherboard form factor in late 2004 and early 2005.

It was designed to alleviate some of the issues that arose from using newer technologies (which often demand more power and create more heat) on motherboards compliant with the circa 1996 ATX specification. The ATX and BTX standards were both proposed by Intel. However, future development of BTX retail products by Intel was canceled in September 2006 following Intel's decision to refocus on low-power CPUs after suffering scaling and thermal issues with the Pentium 4.

The first company to implement BTX was Gateway Inc, followed by Dell and MPC.  The first generation of Apple's Mac Pro used some elements of the BTX design system as well, but was not BTX-compliant, instead using a proprietary form factor.

Enhancements
Low-profile – With the push for ever-smaller systems, a redesigned backplane that shaves inches off height requirements is a benefit to system integrators and enterprises who use rack mounts or blade servers.
Thermal design – The BTX layout establishes a straighter path of airflow with fewer obstacles, resulting in better overall cooling capabilities. There is no dedicated CPU fan – instead, a large 12 cm case fan is mounted, drawing its air directly from outside the computer and cooling the CPU through an airduct. Another distinct feature of BTX is the vertical mounting of the motherboard on the left-hand side. This results in the graphics card heatsink or fan facing upwards, rather than in the direction of the adjacent expansion card.
Structural design – The BTX standard specifies different locations for hardware mounting points, thereby reducing latency between key components and also reduces the physical strain imposed on the motherboard by heat sinks, capacitors and other components dealing with electrical and thermal regulation. For example, the Northbridge and Southbridge chips are located near each other and to the hardware they control like CPU, RAM and expansion ports (PS/2, USB, LPT etc.)

picoBTX

Pico BTX is a motherboard form factor that is meant to miniaturize the  BTX standard. Pico BTX motherboards measure . This is smaller than many current "micro"-sized motherboards, hence the name  "pico". These motherboards share a common top half with the other sizes in the BTX line, but support only one or two expansion slots, designed for half-height or riser card applications.

The heat sink to be attached to the CPU, called "Thermal Module" throughout the official specification, is no longer attached solely to the motherboard, but to the casing itself, so that the inertial load of its mass during a mechanical shock event can no longer damage the motherboard.

The structural interface between the heat sink and the chassis, is defined as 4 mounting holes with the distances of 4.4 × 2.275 in (55.79 × 111.76 mm) between one another. And since this attachment means is also required to have a certain stiffness, it is called "Support and Retention Module (SRM)" in the specification.

Compatibility with ATX products
In the first months of production the ATX and BTX motherboards were so similar that moving a BTX motherboard to an ATX case was possible and vice versa. This was possible because the first BTX motherboards were ATX motherboards turned upside down, except for the component location that really were BTX positioning.

Later the BTX form factor had a big change by turning it into a mirror image of the ATX standard. Since the new motherboard design, both standards are incompatible. Basically BTX motherboards are 'leftside-right' compared to ATX and not upside-down as before: i.e. they are mounted on the opposite side of the case. Some computer cases such as the Cooler Master Series (Stackers) were released to support a varying range of motherboard standards such as ATX, BTX, Mini-ATX and so forth, to ease motherboard upgrade without buying a new case; however, all connector and slot standards are identical, including PCI(e) cards, processors, RAM, hard drives, etc.

BTX power supply units can be exchanged with newer ATX12V units, but not with older ATX power supplies that don't have the extra 4-pin 12V connector, which was introduced with the ATX12V standard.

Reception

The BTX form factor has not been widely adopted despite its improvements over ATX and related standards. As a result, the availability and variety of BTX-compatible components is limited.

One reason for the failure of BTX to gain traction in key markets was the rise of energy-efficient components (CPUs, chipsets and GPUs) which require less power and produce less waste heat, eliminating two of the primary intended benefits of BTX. Another reason was the lack of OEM adopters.

Initially, only Gateway and Dell offered computers with the new format, later HP and Fujitsu-Siemens (now Fujitsu) also offered some BTX-based computers. Most other manufacturers stayed with the ATX standard, and even the handful of manufacturers who did adopt BTX for some products continued to produce the bulk of their machines with the ATX form factor.

References

External links
 Balanced Technology eXtended (BTX) Form Factor — The Future of Cases & Motherboards from AnandTech
 Hardware Analysis' evaluation of the BTX proposal
 Anandtech's coverage of a 2004 trade show, where Intel featured BTX.
 "Whatever happened to BTX?" by Jon Chappell at Game Central Network
 Intel to offer Mini-ITX desktop board
 Intel Desktop Boards Products List
 Intel BTX chassis designs cause fury from partners
 Intel "persuades" hardware makers to shift to one kilo BTX heatsinks
 BTX information and products

Documentation
 FormFactors.org, an Intel-sponsored website dedicated to maintaining data and tools regarding the implementation of various form factors.
 Balanced Technology Extended (BTX) Chassis Design Guidelines Revision 1.1
 Balanced Technology Extended (BTX) Interface Specification Revision 1.0b
 Balanced Technology Extended (BTX) Interface Specification Errata A Revision 1.0
 Balanced Technology Extended (BTX) System Design Guide Revision 1.1
 Balanced Technology Extended (BTX) Entertainment PC Case Study Revision 1.0

IBM PC compatibles
Motherboard form factors